A rasp is a coarse form of file used for coarsely shaping wood or other material. Typically a hand tool, it consists of a generally tapered rectangular, round, or half-round sectioned bar of case hardened steel with distinct, individually cut teeth. A narrow, pointed tang is common at one end, to which a handle may be fitted.

Use
Rasps come in a variety of shapes—rectangular, round, and half-round—and vary in coarseness from finest, "cabinet", to most aggressive, "wood". Farriers, for example, commonly use rasps to remove excess wall from a horse's hoof. They are also used in woodworking for rapidly removing material and are easier to control than a drawknife. The rough surfaces they leave may be smoothed with finer tools, such as single- or double-cut files. Rasps are used in shaping alabaster. Saws and chisels are used to rough out alabaster work.

See also

Surform

References

Woodworking hand tools
Files (tool)
Alabaster